Mikhlin, Mihlin or Michlin is a Russian Jewish surname. It is patronymic surname derived from the given name Michl, a Yiddish version of the name Michael. Notable people with this surname include:

 (1930-2007), Soviet and Russian lawyer and legal theorist, colonel of the Ministry of Internal Affairs
 (born 1938), Soviet violinist
Solomon Mikhlin (1908-1990), Soviet mathematician

Jewish surnames
Yiddish-language surnames
Patronymic surnames

ru:Михлин
de:Michlin